Fenerbahçe Ülker is the professional men's basketball department of Fenerbahçe, a major multisport club based in Istanbul, Turkey.

For the season roster: 2014-15 Roster

Group C regular season

Fixtures/results
All times given below are in Central European Time.

Statistics

Updated to game played on 18 December 2014

Group F Top 16

Fixtures/results
All times given below are in Central European Time.

Statistics

Updated to game played on 9 April 2015

Quarter-finals

Fixtures/results
All times given below are in Central European Time.

Final four

Semifinals
All times are CEST (UTC+2).

Third-place playoff

Final

Individual awards
Euroleague MVP
 Nemanja Bjelica

All-Euroleague First Team
 Nemanja Bjelica

All-Euroleague Second Team
 Andrew Goudelock

Euroleague Rising Star
 Bogdan Bogdanović

Euroleague MVP of the Month
 Nemanja Bjelica, March

Euroleague Weekly MVPs
 Andrew Goudelock - Regular Season, Week 2
 Andrew Goudelock -  Regular Season, Week 5
 Bogdan Bogdanović - Top 16, Week 11

References

External links
Official Fenerbahçe site 
Euro League Page 
TBLStat.net 
Euroleague Format
Euroleague.net
Fenerbahçe fansite 

2014-15
2014–15 in Turkish basketball by club
2014–15 Euroleague by club